Lorenzo Terence Ingram (born 14 April 1983) is a Jamaican first-class cricketer who played for Jamaica national cricket team in West Indian domestic cricket. He is a left-handed batsman as slow left-arm orthodox bowler.

References

External links
 

1983 births
Living people
People from Trelawny Parish
Jamaica cricketers
Jamaican cricketers
Lincolnshire cricketers
West Indies B cricketers